216 Kleopatra is a large M-type asteroid with a mean diameter of  and is noted for its elongate bone or dumbbell shape. It was discovered on 10 April 1880 by Austrian astronomer Johann Palisa at the Austrian Naval Pola Observatory, in what is now Pula, Croatia, and was named after Cleopatra, the famous Egyptian queen. It  has two small minor-planet moons which were discovered in 2008 and later named Alexhelios and Cleoselene.

Orbit and classification 

Kleopatra is a non-family asteroid from the main belt's background population. It orbits the Sun in the central asteroid belt at a distance of 2.1–3.5 AU once every 4 years and 8 months (1,706 days; semi-major axis of 2.79 AU). Its orbit has an eccentricity of 0.25 and an inclination of 13° with respect to the ecliptic. The body's observation arc begins at Leipzig Observatory  on 20 April 1880, ten days after to its official discovery observation at Pola Observatory.

Physical characteristics

Size and Shape 

The initial mapping of its elongated shape was indicated by stellar occultation observations from eight distinct locations on 19 January 1991. Subsequent observations with the ESO 3.6 m Telescope at La Silla, run by the European Southern Observatory, were interpreted to show a double source with two distinct lobes of similar size. These results were disputed when radar observations at the Arecibo Observatory showed that the two lobes of the asteroid are connected, resembling the shape of a ham-bone. The radar observations provided a detailed shape model that appeared on the cover of Science Magazine. Later models suggested that Kleopatra was more elongate and the most recent models using radar delay-Doppler imaging, adaptive optics, and stellar occultations provide dimensions of 267 × 61 × 48 km.

Moons 
In 1988 a search for satellites or dust orbiting this asteroid was performed using the UH88 telescope at the Mauna Kea Observatories, but the effort came up empty. In September 2008, Franck Marchis and his collaborators announced that by using the Keck Observatory's adaptive optics system, they had discovered two moons orbiting Kleopatra. In February 2011, the minor-planet moons were named Alexhelios  (outer) and Cleoselene  (inner), after Cleopatra's children Alexander Helios and Cleopatra Selene II. The outer and inner satellites are about 8.9 ± 1.6 and 6.9 ± 1.6 km in diameter, with periods of 2.7 and 1.8 days, respectively.

Mass, Bulk Density, and Composition 
The presence of two moons provides a way to estimate Kleopatra's mass, although its irregular shape makes the orbital modeling a challenge.

These recent bulk density results call into question the canonical view of Kleopatra as a pure metallic object. Kleopatra's radar albedo suggests a high metal content in the southern hemisphere, but is similar to the more common S- an C-class asteroids along the equator. One way to reconcile these observations is to hypothesize that Kleopatra is a rubble-pile asteroid with significant porosity in dynamic equilibrium.

Origin 

One possible origin that explains Kleopatra's shape, rotation, and moons is that it was created by an oblique impact perhaps 100 million years ago. The increased rotation would have elongated the asteroid and caused Alexhelios to split off. Cleoselene may have split off later, around 10 million years ago. Kleopatra is a contact binary – if it were spinning much faster, the two lobes would separate from each other, making a true binary system.

See also 
List of exceptional asteroids

References

External links
 Lightcurve plot of 216 Kleopatra, Palmer Divide Observatory, B. D. Warner (2006)
 Triplicity and physical characteristics of Asteroid (216) Kleopatra
 Astronomers Catch Images of Giant Metal Dog Bone Asteroid – NASA article, May 2000 
 An Asteroid for the Dogs, August 2000 
 Dictionary of Minor Planet Names, Google books
 Discovery Circumstances: Numbered Minor Planets (1)-(5000) – Minor Planet Center
 
 

000216
Discoveries by Johann Palisa
Named minor planets
000216
216 Kleopatra
000216
000216
18800410
000216